Mario Streit (born 14 April 1967 in Rathenow) is a German rower.

References 
 
 

1967 births
Living people
People from Rathenow
People from Bezirk Potsdam
East German male rowers
Sportspeople from Brandenburg
Olympic rowers of Germany
Rowers at the 1988 Summer Olympics
Olympic silver medalists for East Germany
Olympic medalists in rowing
Medalists at the 1988 Summer Olympics
Recipients of the Patriotic Order of Merit in silver